William Pryor is an American former Negro league pitcher who played between 1927 and 1931.

Pryor made his Negro leagues debut in 1927 with the Memphis Red Sox. In 20 recorded games with Memphis that season, he worked 117 innings and posted a 4.31 ERA. He pitched for the Detroit Stars in 1931.

References

External links
 and Baseball-Reference Black Baseball stats and Seamheads

Year of birth missing
Place of birth missing
Detroit Stars players
Memphis Red Sox players
Baseball pitchers